Manuel Arroyo (born 6 July 2002) is an Argentine rugby union player, currently playing for Italian United Rugby Championship side Benetton. His preferred position is Hooker.

Signed in August 2022 as Academy Player, he made his debut for Benetton in Round 4 of the 2022–23 United Rugby Championship against .

In 2022, Arroyo was named in the Argentina Under 20 squad.

References

External links
itsrugby.co.uk Profile

Living people
Argentine rugby union players
Italian rugby union players
Benetton Rugby players
Rugby union hookers
2002 births
Sportspeople from Mendoza, Argentina